KCST-FM (106.9 FM) is a radio station broadcasting an Adult Contemporary format. Licensed to Florence, Oregon, United States, the station serves the central Oregon Coast.  The station is currently owned by Coast Broadcasting Co., Inc. and features programming from ABC Radio . The station also broadcasts local Siuslaw High School and Mapleton Junior/Senior High School sports.  KCST is part of the Oregon Sports Network, airing Oregon Ducks Sports.

History
The station went on the air as KPVX on July 30, 1992.  On November 16, 1992, the station changed its call sign to the current KCST-FM.

Notable Former Staff

Neil Everett, co-anchor of the West Coast edition of ESPN SportsCenter.
Lawrence "Lonny" Whelchel veteran NW radio broadcaster KPNW-Eugene intern 1976, KZOK-Seattle 1978–79, KTAC-Tacoma 1980, KUBE-Seattle 1982–83, O'Day Broadcasting-Seattle1983, KPAM-Lake Oswego 1984, KCST AM/FM from 1989 till 2001. KKNU Eugene, Or. 2001–04. KFIR 720AM Albany, Or. 2019-2020. Currently owns Sure Hits Productions in Eugene, Or.

References

External links

CST-FM
Radio stations established in 1992
1992 establishments in Oregon